Craig's Wife is the title of two films based on the play of the same name:

 Craig's Wife (1928 film), a silent film  starring Irene Rich, Warner Baxter and Virginia Bradford
 Craig's Wife (1936 film), starring Rosalind Russell and John Boles

See also
 Harriet Craig, another film adaptation of the play